Apache is a 1954 American Western film directed by Robert Aldrich and starring Burt Lancaster, Jean Peters and John McIntire. The film was based on the novel Broncho Apache by Paul Wellman, which was published in 1936. It was Aldrich's first color film.

Plot
Following the surrender of the great leader Geronimo, Massai — the last Apache warrior — is captured and sent on a prison train to a reservation in Florida. But he manages to escape in Oklahoma and heads back to his homeland to win back his woman and settle down to grow crops. His pursuers have other ideas, though.

Cast
 Burt Lancaster as Massai
 Jean Peters as Nalinle
 John McIntire as Al Sieber
 Charles Buchinsky as Hondo
 John Dehner as Weddle
 Paul Guilfoyle as Santos
 Ian MacDonald as Clagg
 Walter Sande as Lieutenant Colonel Beck
 Morris Ankrum as Dawson
 Monte Blue as Geronimo

Production
In April 1952 Burt Lancaster announced he would star in a film based on the novel, to be produced by himself and Harold Hecht. Lancaster had previously played an American Indian in Jim Thorpe – All-American. Both Lancaster and his love interest, played by Jean Peters, appeared in brownface in the film.

For four years Lancaster and Hecht had been based at Warner Bros. However in June 1953 they announced they would make two films with United Artists, starting with Apache. The film would be the first in a series of movies Lancaster made for United Artists. It was originally budgeted at $742,000.

In July 1953 the producers hired Robert Aldrich as a director. Aldrich says this was on the back of his second feature as director, World for Ransom, along with the fact that he had previously worked for Hecht-Lancaster on other movies as an assistant and had tried to buy the original novel himself.

The ending of the novel featured the leading character killed by US troops. "Of course, United Artists and Hecht became apprehensive of that so called down-beat ending," said Aldrich. "I made noise but they didn't hear me; then you go through the steps but you know they're going to use that happy ending."

Shooting
Filming started October 19, 1953, in Sonora, after a week of rehearsal. Lancaster tore a ligament while filming a horse scene on the film. He returned to filming relatively quickly.

Reception

Box office
Aldrich subsequently directed Hecht-Lancaster's next film, Vera Cruz.

In France, the film sold 1,216,098 tickets at the box office.

Critical
 At the time, Clyde Gilmour praised the film as "one of the most exciting and entertaining westerns Hollywood has produced," while the New York Times criticized it as "slow and dull." Retrospective reviews have praised the film for its "acceptance of the alien nature of the Apache" and "more than the standard revisionist bromides."

See also
 Winnetou
 Whitewashing in film

References

External links
 
 

1954 films
1954 Western (genre) films
American Western (genre) films
Revisionist Western (genre) films
Films about Native Americans
Apache Wars films
Films shot in Arizona
Films shot in California
Films shot in Los Angeles County, California
Films directed by Robert Aldrich
Films produced by Burt Lancaster
Films produced by Harold Hecht
Films scored by David Raksin
Norma Productions films
United Artists films
1950s English-language films
1950s American films